The 2021 CFL Global Draft took place on April 15, 2021 and was the first CFL Draft that pooled all of the global players together after previously having separate drafts for Mexican players and European players in 2019. 36 players were chosen from among eligible players following a virtual CFL Combine. The order of the draft was determined by random lottery, similar to the system used for the 2021 CFL Draft. As a snake draft, each odd round was in the opposite order of each even round.

Background
The Canadian Football League introduced global players for the 2019 CFL season through the LFA and European drafts where each team was required to have one of these player on the active roster and up to two on the practice roster. The league had planned to have one single draft for global players in 2020 just before the start of the season, but with the 2020 CFL season cancelled, so was this draft. The 2020 draft was planned to have five rounds 

For the 2021 CFL season, teams are required to keep two global players on the active roster and up to three on the practice roster. Global players are required to sign their first contracts for a length of two years plus a one-year club option.

Trades
In the explanations below, (D) denotes trades that took place during the draft, while (PD) indicates trades completed pre-draft.

Round three
 Toronto → Calgary (PD).  Toronto traded this selection and a fifth-round pick in the 2021 CFL Draft to Calgary in exchange for a sixth-round pick in the 2021 CFL Draft, a fourth-round pick in the 2021 Global Draft, and the rights to Eric Rogers, Cordarro Law, and Robertson Daniel.

Round four
 Calgary → Toronto (PD).  Calgary traded this selection, a sixth-round pick in the 2021 CFL Draft, and the rights to Eric Rogers, Cordarro Law, and Robertson Daniel to Toronto in exchange for a fifth-round pick in the 2021 CFL Draft and a third-round pick in the 2021 Global Draft.

Draft order

Round one

Round two

Round three

Round four

See also
2021 CFL Draft

References
Trade references

General references

Canadian College Draft
2021 in Canadian football